Paye is a surname and may refer to:

Sports
Aaron Paye (born 1981), American-Liberian football player
Charlie Paye (born 1887), Irish Gaelic footballer
Djibril Tamsir Paye (born 1990), Guinean footballer
John Paye (born 1965), American football quarterback
Kate Paye (born 1974), American basketball coach
Kwity Paye (born 1998), American football player
Michael Paye (born 1983), American wheelchair basketball player
Mick Paye (born 1966), English footballer
Ndialou Paye (born 1974), Senegalese basketball player
Pape Paye (born 1990), French footballer

Other
Harry Paye (died 1419), English privateer and smuggler
Jean-Claude Paye (born 1934), Belgian sociologist
Lucien Paye (1907–1972), French politician
Ndella Paye (born c. 1974), Senegal-born French Afro-feminist
Robert Paye, pseudonym of British author Marjorie Bowen (1885–1952)
Robin Fraser-Paye, British costume designer